Gina Kim (born 1973, South Korea) is a filmmaker and academic. Kim's five feature-length films and short films have garnered acclaim through screenings at most major film festivals and at venues such as the MOMA, Centre Pompidou and the Smithsonian. According to Film Comment, Kim has "a terrific eye, a gift for near-wordless storytelling, a knack for generating a tense gliding rhythm between images and sounds, shots and scenes, and for yielding a quality of radiance in her actors". Between 2004–2007 and 2013–2014, Kim taught film production and theory classes at Harvard University, being the first Asian woman teaching in her department (Visual and Environmental Studies). Kim was also a member of the Jury for the 66th Venice Film Festival and the Asian Pacific Screen Awards in 2009. Currently, Kim is a professor at the UCLA School of Theater, Film, and Television.

Film career

Gina Kim's Video Diary (1995–2002)
In 1995, upon moving to the United States for her MFA, Kim began shooting Gina Kim's Video Diary. In it, Kim realizes a vision of the modern female nomad—one who travels fluidly not only between Asia and America, but between multiple languages, film genres, and personal, local and cinematic histories. Screened at the Berlin Film Festival, Gina Kim's Video Diary was described in the catalogue as "an extremely personal account of one' woman's fears, fantasies and projections" that "provides the viewer with an unusual self-portrait that is deeply unsettling, moving and life-affirming", and now it is frequently cited as a classic in the genre of personal documentaries.

Invisible Light (2003) 
Following Gina Kim's Video Diary, Kim began making fiction films to further many of the same concerns as her documentary work. Invisible Light (2003) tracks the physical and psychological journeys of two Korean/Korean-American women, which led Cahiers du Cinéma to call it "a little block of feminine hardness and repressed anger". Senses of Cinema also asserts that "Kim's rigorous mise-en-scene matches the unflinching singularity of her vision." In addition to winning the special award at the 2004 Seoul Women's Film Festival, Invisible Light has been screened at more than 23 film festivals and in over 15 countries.

Never Forever (2007) 
Kim's next film, Never Forever, premiered at the 2007 Sundance Film Festival and was nominated for its Grand Jury Prize. Starring Vera Farmiga and Ha Jung-woo, Never Forever engages the generic conventions of melodrama to examine facets of gender, sexuality, race and class for both women and Koreans in America. Never Forever was the first co-production between the United States and South Korea, and it was commended by Variety for "Kim's highly sensitive camera", which "turns the film into a chamber-piece hushed eroticism and surprising narrative grip". Martin Scorsese has also called the film, "A moving experience [in which] the performances are wonderful and touching, and the style...intense and very precise." Kim was nominated as Best New Director for the Grand Bell Awards (South Korea's Academy Awards), and Never Forever won the Jury Prize at the 2007 Deauville American Film Festival.

Faces of Seoul (2009) 
Following a commission by the Korea Foundation, Kim returned to her documentary work and created a video essay called Faces of Seoul, which "reveals Korea's capital as a dynamic place where these opposing concepts—language vs. image, tradition vs. modern, native knowledge vs. exotic encounter—rub against each other without yielding a single dominant perspective."  Praised as a "palimpsest of time" by Seoul National University Professor Min Eun Kyung, Faces of Seoul combines both original and archival footage, including video taken by Kim herself of the infamous Sampoong Department Store collapse in 1995. Faces of Seoul premiered at the 2009 Venice Film Festival, where Kim was invited to be a jury member. Subsequently, she was featured in L'Uomo Vogue as one of the "Talents of Venice".

Final Recipe (2013) 
Kim's most recent film is 2013's Final Recipe, a Thai-Korean co-production starring Michelle Yeoh and Henry Lau. It premiered at the 2013 San Sebastian Film Festival as the opening film for the Culinary Zinema section and was invited to be the opening film for the Hawaii International Film Festival.  Final Recipe is the first English-language film made by an Asian director with all Asian stars, and it can be seen as Kim's response to any sense of a single dominating Asian culture, as well as Hollywood's past appropriations of Asia. It features actors and crew from all over the continent, such China, Japan, South Korea, Singapore and Thailand. The Hollywood Reporter commends Kim for how "she conjures a non-exotic piece out of a territory-trotting narrative, where every place is made to seem like home". Final Recipe also opened the Culinary Cinema section of the 2014 Berlin Film Festival.

In January 2015, Final Recipe was announced as the first official co-production between China and South Korea.

The film was wide released in China on August 26, 2016 and opened on 3,240 theaters nationwide. The film will be released in the US and South Korea in 2017.

Bloodless (2017) 
Bloodless is a 12 minute VR film that deals with camp town sex workers for US army personnel stationed in South Korea since the 1950s. The film traces the last living moments of a real-life sex worker who was brutally murdered by a US soldier at the Dongducheon Camptown in South Korea in 1992. Portraying the last hours of her life in the camp town, the VR film transposes a historical and political issue into a personal and concrete experience. This film was shot on location where the crime took place, bringing to light ongoing experiences at the 96 camp towns near or around the US military bases.

Bloodless was awarded the Best VR Story Award at the 74th Venice Film Festival.

Tearless (2021) 
Tearless (2021) was awarded the Reflet d'Or for the best immersive work at the 27th Geneva International Film Festival.

Academic and teaching career 
Kim received her Bachelor of Fine Arts degree from Seoul National University in 1996 before moving to the United States to attend the California Institute of the Arts where she received her Masters of Fine Arts in 1999.

Between 2004–2007, and 2013–2014, Kim has taught film production and theory classes at Harvard University, being the first Asian woman teaching in her department. Kim's Korean Cinema course was also the first of its kind taught at an Ivy League college, and in 2005 she curated the series "Visions from the South: South Korean Films from 1960–2003" at the Harvard Film Archive. As acknowledgment of special contribution to the teaching of undergraduates at Harvard College, she was awarded a Certificate of Teaching Excellence from Harvard University in October 2014.

Kim became a professor at the UCLA School of Theater, Film and Television in 2017.

Publication 

In 2017, L'atelier des Cahiers published Séoul, Visages d'une Ville, a multimedia photo book essay based on Kim's feature length documentary Faces of Seoul (2009).

In 2018 Kim was listed as one of the "Top Teachers in Film, TV" by Variety magazine.

Filmography

References

Further reading 

 "For director, video art opens door to world".  Korea JoongAng Daily. September 10, 2013.
 "VR TROOPER: GINA KIM". Anthem Magazine. June 5, 2017.
 "Sex Crimes and Virtual Reality: Best VR Storytelling of 2017, Gina Kim's Bloodless" .Filmmaker Magazine. December 22, 2017.
 "[Case Study] Interview with Gina Kim on BLOODLESS and TEARLESS". XRMust. September 2, 2021.

External links 
 
 
Gina Kim UCLA Faculty Page
Gina Kim at Mubi

Living people
1973 births
South Korean women film directors
South Korean film directors